The Great Barrier is a 1937 British historical drama film directed by Milton Rosmer and Geoffrey Barkas and starring Richard Arlen, Lilli Palmer and Antoinette Cellier. The film depicts the construction of the Canadian Pacific Railway. It was based on the 1935 novel The Great Divide by Alan Sullivan. It was made at the Lime Grove Studios in Shepherd's Bush. The film's sets were designed by Walter Murton.

Cast
 Richard Arlen as Hickey 
 Lilli Palmer as Lou 
 Antoinette Cellier as Mary Moody 
 Barry MacKay as Steve 
 Roy Emerton as Moody 
 J. Farrell MacDonald as Major Rogers
 Ben Welden as Joe 
 Jock MacKay as Bates 
 Ernest Sefton as Magistrate 
 Henry Victor as Bulldog Kelly 
 Reginald Barlow as James Hill 
 Arthur Loft as William Van Horne 
 Frank McGlynn Sr. as Sir John MacDonald

Production
It was one of a series of British Empire-related movies made by Gaumont around this time, others including Rhodes of Africa, The Flying Doctor and Soldiers Three.

The film involved 16 weeks location shooting in Canada.

Barbara Greene was borrowed from Fox. Location filming finished in June 1936.

Reception
Writing for The Spectator in 1937, Graham Greene gives the film a generally good review, describing it as "a thoroughly worthy picture", "well acted, well produced [and] a little less than well written". Greene praised the saloon shindy and horseback race scenes, and commended Palmer's acting, however his primary criticism was that "it shrinks into significance, with its conventional love-story and the impression it leaves that the building of a railway depends on the heroic efforts of one or three men and a girl".

References

Bibliography
 Cook, Pam. Gainsborough Pictures. Cassell, 1997.

External links

1937 films
1937 Western (genre) films
1930s historical drama films
British historical drama films
British Western (genre) films
Films directed by Geoffrey Barkas
Films directed by Milton Rosmer
Films shot at Lime Grove Studios
Films set in Canada
Films set in the 1880s
Films shot in British Columbia
Rail transport films
Films scored by Jack Beaver
British black-and-white films
1937 drama films
1930s English-language films
1930s British films
Gainsborough Pictures films